Safi or Asfi is a city in western Morocco on the Atlantic Ocean. It is the capital of Asfi Province. It recorded a population of 308,508 in the 2014 Moroccan census. The city was occupied by the Portuguese Empire from 1488 to 1541, was the center of Morocco's weaving industry, and became a fortaleza of the Portuguese Crown in 1508. Safi is the main fishing port for the country's sardine industry, and also exports phosphates, textiles and ceramics. During the Second World War, Safi was the site of Operation Blackstone, one of the landing sites for Operation Torch.

Etymology
The city's name as it is locally pronounced is "Asfi", which was Latinized as "Safi" and "Safim" under Portuguese rule. "Asfi" means flood or river estuary in Berber and comes from the Berber verbal root "ffey/sfi/sfey" which means to flood, to spill or to pour.

11th-century geographer Al-Idrisi gave an apparently false  explanation to the origin the name "Aasafi" as he linked it to the Arabic word "Asaf" (regret); Asafi (my regret). He based this claim on a strange story about some sailors from al-Andalus who sailed to discover the other end of the Atlantic Ocean but got lost and landed on some island where the natives captured them and sent them back on their ships blindfolded. The ships eventually ended on the shores of "Safi" and locals helped the lost sailors and told them that they were two months away from their native land al-Andalus. Upon hearing this one of the sailors responded by saying: "Wa asafi" (Oh my regret). Al-Idrisi wrote that from that time the city carried the name "Aasafi". This story is thought to be a legend  and unlikely explanation of the origin of the name.

Climate 
Safi has a hot-summer Mediterranean climate (Köppen climate classification Csa).

History

Safi, under the name Safim (Zaffim or Asfi), is one of the oldest cities in Morocco. According to historian Mohammed al-Kanuni, Safi must be identified with the ancient Thymiaterium or Carcunticus and was founded by the Carthaginian Hanno during his Periplus as related by Pliny the Elder.

Under the Almohads it functioned as an important port to the capital Marrakesh.

The city was under Portuguese rule from 1488 to 1541; it is believed that they abandoned it to the Saadians (who were at war with them), since the city proved difficult to defend from land attacks. The Portuguese fortress built to protect the city is still there today.

After 1541, the city played a major role in Morocco as one of the safest and biggest seaports in the country. Many ambassadors to the Saadian and Alaouite kings during the 16th–18th centuries came to Morocco via Safi; its proximity to Marrakech, then capital of Morocco, helped expand the maritime trade in the city.
Louis De Chénier, consul of the French court in Morocco in 1767, reported that the city was the only usable seaport at the time.
 
A French Navy  captive, Bidé de Maurville, who wrote the account of his stay in Morocco in his 1765 book Relations de l'affaire de Larache, reported the presence of an important number of foreign trading houses in the city : Dutch, Danish, British and French.

After the Sultan Mohammed ben Abdallah built the city of Mogador (modern-day Essaouira), he banned foreign trade in all Moroccan ports except in his newly built city. Consequently, Safi stopped playing a leading role in the Moroccan trade.

Safi's patron saint is Abu Mohammed Salih.

In 1942 as part of Operation Torch, American forces attacked Safi in Operation Blackstone. During November 8-10, 1942 the Americans took control over Safi and its port and took relatively few casualties compared to the other operations at Casablanca and at Port Mehdia.

Population
The inhabitants are composed of Berbers and Arabs descendants.

The Berber origin is related to:
 The berbers who lived in the region before the foundation of the city.
 The berbers who came later from the sous plains, south of the region.

The Arab origin is related to two tribes:
 Abda: They descend from Banu Hilal and have hugtalled in the region in the twelfth century and spawned : Bhatra and Rabiaa.
 Ahmar: They descend from Maqil.

Safi also used to have a large Jewish community, more than 20% of the population, many  of whom subsequently emigrated to France, Canada and Israel.

Economy

In the early 20th century, the Algerian potter Boujemâa Lamali established a pottery school in Safi, supported by the colonial administration.  Since then pottery has been a mainstay of Safi's economy. Prior to the COVID-19 pandemic there were 2,000 registered artisans working in the city's 212 workshops, and thousands more unregistered artisans.

Sport
Football and rugby are popular sports in Safi. The local football team Olympic Safi have been competing in Morocco's premier football division, Botola, since 2004.
The Rugby Union team of the same name is one of Morocco's best, having won the "Coupe du Trône" several times. There also is a little Tennis Sport Club with a couple of fields (following the high road, beyond the Colline des Poitiers)

The European Cemetery
There is an abandoned European Cemetery in Safi. Some of the marble decorations have been stolen from the richest tombs, including: Russian, Portuguese, Spanish (e.g. the Do Carmo family), Italian (e,g. the Bormioli family), French (e.g. the Chanel family), German and other European nationals. Some engravings identifying or memorializing the deceased have also been stolen. Although there are 19th century tombs present, most are of pre-independence  (1956) 20th century origin.

Notable people
Nadiya El Hani, Moroccan Journalist and Data Analyst.
Mehdi Aissaoui, Moroccan Actor.
Meir Ben-Shabbat, Israel's National Security Adviser and Chief of Staff for National Security. -->
Edmond Amran El Maleh, Moroccan writer
Mohamed Bajeddoub, Andalusian classical music singer
Mohamed Benhima, former Prime Minister of Morocco, Minister of Education and Minister of the Interior.
Brahim Boulami & Khalid Boulami, Moroccan Athletes
Driss Benhima, CEO of Royal Air Maroc and president of Hawd Assafi, Safi-based non-profit organization
Samy Elmaghribi, Moroccan musician
Michel Galabru, French actor
Ahmed Ghayby, member of the Moroccan football federation and president of Olympic Safi
Abderrahim Goumri, Moroccan long-distance runner
Zakaria El Masbahi, Moroccan basketball player
Haja Hamounia, traditional chanteuse of Bedouin song

Mohamed Mjid, former longtime president of the Royal Moroccan Tennis Federation
Aharon Nahmias, Israeli politician
Abu Mohammed Salih, 12th century religious leader
Mohamed Reggab: film director
Uri Sebag: Israeli politician
Abraham Ben Zmirro: 15th century rabbi
Abderrazak Hamdallah, professional footballer
Yahia Attiyat Allah, professional footballer

See also
People from Safi, Morocco

Gallery

References

External links
Entry in Lexicorient
 

 
Populated places in Safi Province
Safi, Morocco
Municipalities of Morocco
1488 establishments in the Portuguese Empire
Morocco geography articles needing translation from French Wikipedia